Serixia trigonocephala is a species of beetle in the family Cerambycidae. It was described by Heller in 1915.

References

Serixia
Beetles described in 1915